Waltham Town Lock (No 11) is a lock on the River Lee Navigation at Waltham Cross, Hertfordshire. The lock is located in the River Lee Country Park which is part of the Lee Valley Park. The adjoining Showground site now known as the Broxbourne White Water Canoe Centre has been chosen to host the canoeing event in the 2012 Summer Olympics.

Flowing close to the lock is the River Lee Flood Relief Channel known as the Horsemill Stream at this point.

Public access 
Vehicular access from A121 Station road to car parking close to lock.

Pedestrian and cycle access via the towpath which forms part of the Lea Valley Walk

Public transport

Waltham Cross railway station

Bus services; 211, 212, 213, 240, 250, 251, 506.

References

External links 
 Waltham Town Lock - a history

Locks in Hertfordshire
Locks in Essex
Locks of the Lee Navigation
Waltham Cross